Kay Khan (born June 22, 1941) is an American politician and a Democratic member serving in the Massachusetts House of Representatives. She has represented the City of Newton in the Massachusetts House of Representatives since 1995.

Early life and career 
Khan earned her bachelor's degree from Boston University School of Nursing. Her first job as a nurse was at Boston Children's Hospital. Following this, she became an instructor for Boston University School of Nursing undergraduate students on a pediatric rotation. She went on to earn a master's degree in psychiatric mental health nursing from Boston University, graduating with honors and worked in a private group practice in Newton for close to twenty years.

Khan has led several caucuses in the Massachusetts House, such as the Mental Health Caucus and the Women Legislators Caucus among others. Khan has also been a part of several task forces and commissions such as the Commission to End Homelessness and the Special Commission on Early Education and Care and the Task Force on Justice Involved Women and Their Children, under the aegis of the Massachusetts Caucus of Women Legislators. Khan currently serves on the Unaccompanied Homeless Youth Commission, the Criminal Justice Commission, the Child Sexual Abuse Prevention Task Force, the Task Force on Child Welfare Data Reporting, the Massachusetts Coalition to Ban Conversion Therapy on Minors, and the Department of Youth Services Safety Task Force.

Khan is an adamant supporter of improving the rights, health, well-being, and conditions of incarcerated individuals.

Personal life 
Khan has lived in Newton for more than forty years and has three children and seven grandchildren.

See also
 Massachusetts House of Representatives' 11th Middlesex district
 2019–2020 Massachusetts legislature
 2021–2022 Massachusetts legislature

References

1941 births
Living people
Democratic Party members of the Massachusetts House of Representatives
Women state legislators in Massachusetts
Politicians from Newton, Massachusetts
21st-century American politicians
21st-century American women politicians
20th-century American politicians
20th-century American women politicians
Boston University School of Nursing alumni
Boston University faculty
Nurses from Massachusetts
American women nurses